The 1998 Luxembourg Grand Prix (formally the Grosser Warsteiner Preis von Luxemburg 1998) was a Formula One motor race held at the Nürburgring, Nürburg, Germany on 27 September 1998. It was the fifteenth and penultimate race of the 1998 FIA Formula One World Championship. The 67-lap race was won by Mika Häkkinen driving for the McLaren team. Michael Schumacher finished second driving a Ferrari car, with David Coulthard third in the other McLaren.

Report
With two races remaining of the season, McLaren's Mika Häkkinen and Ferrari's Michael Schumacher were battling for the drivers title; they were level on 80 points with Häkkinen ahead on countback. However the momentum was with Schumacher who had won the previous race at Monza, whereas Häkkinen had not won a race since the German Grand Prix four races earlier.

Ferrari locked out the front row with Schumacher on pole ahead of Eddie Irvine. Häkkinen qualified third. At the start Irvine passed Schumacher to take the lead, however he allowed his team leader past at the end of the first lap and then proceeded to hold up Häkkinen. The Finn passed the Ulsterman at the Veedol Chicane on lap 14 and began to close on Schumacher. The German pitted on lap 24, while Häkkinen stayed out until lap 28, emerging from his stop ahead of Schumacher albeit by less than a second. Häkkinen resisted pressure from Schumacher during the second stint and narrowly held on to his lead during the second round of pit stops. In the final stint Häkkinen pulled away from Schumacher, extending his lead to five seconds before easing off in the closing laps to take victory by 2.2 seconds from Schumacher, with the other McLaren of David Coulthard completing the podium having leapfrogged Irvine during the first round of pitstops. The win gave Häkkinen a four-point lead in the championship heading into the final race in Suzuka, meaning he would only need second place there to clinch his first title.

Classification

Qualifying

Race

Championship standings after the race
Bold text indicates who still has a theoretical chance of becoming World Champion.

Drivers' Championship standings

Constructors' Championship standings

 Note: Only the top five positions are included for both sets of standings.

References

Luxembourg Grand Prix
Luxembourg Grand Prix
Luxembourg Grand Prix, 1998
Sport in Rhineland-Palatinate
Luxembourg Grand Prix